Large proline-rich protein BAT2 is a protein that in humans is encoded by the BAT2 gene.

Function 

A cluster of genes, BAT1-BAT5, has been localized in the vicinity of the genes for TNF alpha and TNF beta. These genes are all within the human major histocompatibility complex class III region. This gene has microsatellite repeats which are associated with the age-at-onset of insulin-dependent diabetes mellitus (IDDM) and possibly thought to be involved with the inflammatory process of pancreatic beta-cell destruction during the development of IDDM. This gene is also a candidate gene for the development of rheumatoid arthritis. There are two alternatively spliced transcripts encoding different isoforms described for this gene.

Interactions
BAT2 has been shown to interact with:
 C1QBP, 
 EIF3S6, 
 HNRNPA1,
 IFT88, 
 IMMT, and
 UBAP2L.

References

Further reading

External links